In geometry, the quarter order-6 square tiling is a uniform tiling of the hyperbolic plane. It has Schläfli symbol of q{4,6}. It is constructed from *3232 orbifold notation, and can be seen as a half symmetry of *443 and *662, and quarter symmetry of *642.

Images 
Projections centered on a vertex, triangle and hexagon:

Related polyhedra and tiling

See also
Square tiling
Tilings of regular polygons
List of uniform planar tilings
List of regular polytopes

References
 John H. Conway, Heidi Burgiel, Chaim Goodman-Strass, The Symmetries of Things 2008,  (Chapter 19, The Hyperbolic Archimedean Tessellations)

External links 

 Hyperbolic and Spherical Tiling Gallery
 KaleidoTile 3: Educational software to create spherical, planar and hyperbolic tilings
 Hyperbolic Planar Tessellations, Don Hatch

Hyperbolic tilings
Isogonal tilings
Order-6 tilings
Square tilings
Uniform tilings